The OVW Rush Division Championship is a midcard title created and owned by the Ohio Valley Wrestling (OVW) promotion. It was announced on November 20, 2019 on OVW TV Tapings, replacing the Television title which was discarded by Tony Gunn. The RUSH Championship is sponsored by COLLARxELBOW and a brand new division was created for it. The current champion is Luke Kurtis, who is in his second reign.

Title history
AJ Daniels was the inaugural champion. Hy-Zaya has the most reigns at three. Dimes reign is the longest at 273 days, while Hy-Zaya's first reign is the shortest at 10 days.

Luke Kurtis is the current champion in his second reign. He defeated Kal Herro (c) and Star Rider in a three-way match on December 15, 2022, in Louisville, KY.

Combined reigns 

References

External links
OVW Rush Division Championship History

Ohio Valley Wrestling championships